Helju Rebane (born 18 July 1948) is an Estonian writer. She writes mainly prose and  science fiction in the Estonian and Russian languages.

She was born in Tallinn. Her father was philosopher  and her uncles were physicist and former president of the Academy of Sciences of the ESSR Karl Rebane, physicist , and mathematician . She graduated from Tartu State University Tartu with a degree in theoretical mathematics in 1971. From 1972 until 1973, she worked in the department of logic and psychology at the university. Later she studied logic at Moscow University. In Moscow, she was as a lecturer at the Institute of Management Problems of the Scientific and Technical Committee of the USSR from 1974 until 1980, and as a senior engineer at the Ministry of Health Computing Center from 1981 until 1983.

Rebane made her writing debut in the journal Looming in 1981 with the story Väike kohvik. In 1983 she won a prize in the story competition run by the literary journal Noorus.

Works
 1986 story "Väike kohvik". Eesti Raamat, 110 pp
 2011 "Город на Альтрусе: фантастическая повесть и рассказы". Воронеж, 2011. 207 pp
 2017 "50 рассказов". Москва: Ridero, 288 pp
 2017 "Кот в лабиринте: рассказы". Москва: Ridero, 207 pp 
 2021 story "Õige valik". Fantaasia, 181 pp

References

Living people
1948 births
20th-century Estonian women writers
21st-century Estonian women writers
Estonian women short story writers
Estonian science fiction writers
Estonian mathematicians
University of Tartu alumni
Academic staff of the University of Tartu
Writers from Tallinn